Cornelius Comegys Jadwin II (March 22, 1896 – March 3, 1982) was an American equestrian. He competed in two events at the 1936 Summer Olympics.

Biography
Cornelius Jadwin was born in Wilmington, North Carolina on March 22, 1896, the son of Army officer Edgar Jadwin.

He attended the United States Military Academy at West Point, and graduated in 1919.

He died in Warrenton, Virginia on March 3, 1982.

References

1896 births
1982 deaths
American male equestrians
Olympic equestrians of the United States
Equestrians at the 1936 Summer Olympics
Sportspeople from Wilmington, North Carolina
United States Military Academy alumni